Ardisia brittonii is a species of plant in the family Primulaceae. It is endemic to Jamaica.  It is threatened by habitat loss.

References

Endemic flora of Jamaica
brittonii
Endangered plants
Taxonomy articles created by Polbot